Windsor Hills Historic District is a national historic district in Baltimore, Maryland, United States. It is a cohesive residential suburb defined by rolling topography, winding, picturesque streets, stone garden walls, walks and private alley ways, early-20th century garden apartments, duplexes, and freestanding residences. Structures are predominantly of frame construction with locally quarried stone foundations. Windsor Hills developed over a period from  about 1895 through 1929. The dominant styles include Shingle cottages, Dutch Colonial Revival houses, Foursquares, and Craftsman Bungalows.

It was added to the National Register of Historic Places in 2002.

References

External links
, including photo from 2001, at Maryland Historical Trust
Boundary Map of the Windsor Hills Historic District, Baltimore City, at Maryland Historical Trust

Historic districts on the National Register of Historic Places in Baltimore
Shingle Style architecture in Maryland